A portable water tank is a temporary collapsible tank designed for the reserve storage of water in firefighting, emergency relief, and military applications. These tanks can be either supported or unsupported. The supported tanks have a steel or aluminum frame and range in size from or larger by custom design.

Usage/Deployment

It is primarily used in rural areas where fire hydrants are not available. They are carried on water tenders and are deployed at the scene of a fire during a shuttle operation. A portable water tank is usually set up near or front of an attack engine, or possibly next to a supply engine. This enables tenders to quickly drop off their load of water and return to the fill site as soon as possible. They are designed to be set up in around a half-minute with two firefighters. The engine may then use suction hose to draft the water in the tank.

See also
Glossary of firefighting equipment
Water tank

References

External links

Firefighting equipment
Firefighting
Liquid containers
Water